Tattoo Colour is a Thai pop-rock band under the indie label Smallroom.

History
Before coming to Tattoo Colour members, including four people: Harin, Rat, Ekachai and Tanabodee. Initially, they studied in upper secondary school, Khon Kaen University. On graduation,  the members dispersed to study. He left  Harin, Rat and Ekachai. They studied in higher education at the Khon Kaen University. They went for the contest of song “Happy” and won the contest. Enabling them to look at the "Small Room", where they can ask for an audition. After that, an artist’s camp in the Small Room. They wanted Tanabodee to return to the bassist in the band.

Their first album came out titled “Hong Ser”, which launched the single “Fha” (Sky) and “Fak Tee” (keep it) has been incredible. As a result,  they had to release more singles like “Koh Rang” (Deserted island), One Night Stand and “Roy Joob” (Kiss mark).

The group decided to put on their thinking again and moved to a new label “Smallroom”. The result is the release of their second album “Choodtee 8 (Jong Pror)”. The new album was still a pop music variety (Variety pop).  Their first single and MV is called “Kar Moo” (Pork knuckle), followed by “Jum Tam Mai” (Don’t Know Why).

Members
Harin Suthamjarus (Dim) – Vocal
Rat Pikartpairee (Rat) – Guitar 
Ekachai Chotirungroj (Tong) – Drums 
Tanabodee Teerapongpakdee (Jump) – Bass

Discography
 Hong Ser (2006)
Choodtee 8 Jong Pror (2009)
Tongneaw (2010)
Pop Dad (2014)
Sud Jing (2017)

MC
 Online 
 2021 : TCTV : EP.1 On Air YouTube:Tattoo Colour TV (11/5/2021)
 2021 : คาสิโนโลเล EP.1 YouTube:Tattoo Colour TV (2/2/2021)
 2021 : สั่งอาหารหน่อย Club On Air YouTube:Tattoo Colour TV (25/3/2021)
 2022 : VLOGแรกพบ EP.1 On Air YouTube:Tattoo Colour TV (10/3/2022)
 2022 : เกมของเรา EP.1 On Air YouTube:Tattoo Colour TV (12/4/2022)

Concerts
	Wan Soloist Concert 10 years

Awards
	Virgin Hitz Awards 2007
	Seed Awards 2008
	Star Entertainment Awards 2008
	Siamdara Star Awards ปี 2008
	POP Music Awards 2009
	Fat Awards 2009
	Fat Awards 2009
	Best Band The Guitar Mag Award 2011
	 Best Guitarist The Guitar Mag Award 2014
	Nine entertain Award 2015

References 

Thai musical groups
Thai television personalities
Thai YouTubers